The Michalak C7 is a kit car based on the Smart ForTwo. The C7 uses a stainless, fiber reinforced plastic body making it slightly faster than the Smart ForTwo because it is 170 kg lighter. Once the production version was released, Michalak sold some of the prototypes.

References

External links
Official website

Kit cars